Wooden Leather is the second studio album by American hip hop sextet Nappy Roots from Kentucky. It was released on August 26, 2003 via Atlantic Records. Recording sessions took place at Tree Sound and The Zone in Atlanta, at Emerald Sound Studios in Nashville, at QDIII Soundlab, Blakeslee Recording Company, Larrabee West and Cherokee Studios in Los Angeles, at Manhattan Center Studios in New York City, at Skip Taylor Recording and at Unsung Studios. The production was handled by several high-profile record producers such as David Banner, Jake and the Phatman, Kanye West, Lil Jon, Mike Caren, Mike City, Mr. DJ, Needlz, Raphael Saadiq, along with Brian Kidd, Briss, Freddie "Mac" McIntosh, Organic, Sol Messiah, Troy Johnson, Mr. Collipark and Kevin Freeman. It features guest appearances from Anthony Hamilton, Raphael Saadiq, Aura J, Benjamin "Black" Bush, and the Ying Yang Twins.

The album peaked at number 12 on the Billboard 200 and at number 9 on the Top R&B/Hip-Hop Albums chart in the United States. Its lead single, "Roun' the Globe" featuring background vocals from Black of Playa, made it to #96 on the Billboard Hot 100 singles chart.

Track listing

Charts

References

External links 

2003 albums
Nappy Roots albums
Atlantic Records albums
Albums produced by Needlz
Albums produced by Lil Jon
Albums produced by Mike City
Albums produced by Kanye West
Albums produced by David Banner
Albums produced by Raphael Saadiq